Dot Com Blues is a 2001 album by the American jazz organist Jimmy Smith. The album was Smith's first recording for five years, and features guest appearances by B.B. King and Etta James.

On the Billboard Top Jazz Album charts Dot Com Blues peaked at number 8.

Reception

The Allmusic review by Roy Wynn awarded the album three stars and said that the album was 
"...something of a blues sampler with Smith playing a prominent role rather than a Jimmy Smith album. Jazz fans will be happy to know that, after more than 40 years of recording, Smith retains his ability to play, but Dot Com Blues is anything but a showcase for the man whose name is on the cover."

Track listing
"Only in It for the Money" (Dr. John, Mac Rebennack) - 4:35
"8 Counts for Rita" (Jimmy Smith) - 3:39
"Strut" (Taj Mahal) - 5:03
"C.C. Rider" (Ma Rainey, Traditional) - 7:09
"I Just Wanna Make Love to You" (Willie Dixon) - 3:55
"Mood Indigo" (Barney Bigard, Duke Ellington, Irving Mills) - 8:49
"Over and Over" (Keb' Mo') - 5:53
"Three O'Clock Blues" (Jules Bihari, B.B. King) - 4:33
"Dot Com Blues" (Smith) - 5:22
"Mr. Johnson" (John, Rebennack, Smith) - 5:47
"Tuition Blues" (Smith) - 5:51
"Since I Met You Baby" (Ivory Joe Hunter) - 6:35 (Japanese Bonus Track)

Personnel
Jimmy Smith - organ, arranger
Dr. John - piano, Wurlitzer electric piano, vocals, (tracks: 1)
Jon Cleary - Wurlitzer electric piano (tracks: 7)
Chris Stainton - piano (tracks: 8)
Etta James - vocals (tracks: 5)
Sir Harry Bowens - vocals (tracks: 5, 7)
Sweet Pea Atkinson - vocals (tracks: 5, 7)
B.B. King - guitar, vocals (tracks: 8)
Taj Mahal - guitar, vocals (tracks: 3)
Keb' Mo' -  guitar, vocals (tracks: 7)
Russell Malone - guitar (tracks: 2 to 4, 6, 9, 11)
John Porter - guitar (tracks: 1, 5, 8, 10)
Phil Upchurch - guitar  (tracks: 5, 7, 10)
Neil Hubbard - guitar (tracks: 8)
Reggie McBride - bass guitar (tracks: 1 to 5, 7, 9 to 11)
John Porter - bass guitar (tracks: 5)
Pino Palladino - bass guitar  (tracks: 8)
John Clayton - double bass (tracks: 6)
Harvey Mason - drums (tracks: 1 to 7, 9 to 11)
Andy Newmark - drums (tracks: 8)
Lenny Castro - percussion (tracks: 1 to 3, 5, 7, 10)
Darrell Leonard - horn arrangements, trumpet (tracks: 1, 5, 7)
Oscar Brashear - flugelhorn, trumpet (tracks: 1, 5, 7)
Leslie Drayton - flugelhorn, trumpet (tracks: 1, 5, 7)
George Bohannon - trombone, bass trombone (tracks: 1, 5, 7)
Maurice Spears - trombone, bass trombone (tracks: 1, 5, 7)
Joe Sublett - tenor saxophone (tracks: 1, 5, 7, 10)
Herman Riley - tenor saxophone (tracks: 1, 5, 10)

Production
Hollis King - art direction
Billy Kinsley - assistant engineer
Mike Scotella
Katy Teasdale
David Riegel - design
Rik Pekkonen - engineer
Ron Goldstein - executive producer
Barbara Farman - hair stylist, make-up
Bernie Grundman - mastering
James Minchin - photography
John Newcott - release coordinator

References

2001 albums
Albums produced by John Porter (musician)
Blue Thumb Records albums
Jimmy Smith (musician) albums
Verve Records albums